Lincoln North was an electoral district of the Legislative Assembly of the Parliament of the Province of Canada, in Canada West (now Ontario). It was created in 1841, upon the establishment of the Province of Canada by the union of Upper Canada and Lower Canada. Lincoln North was represented by one member in the Legislative Assembly.  It was abolished in 1867, upon the creation of Canada and the province of Ontario.

Boundaries 

Lincoln North electoral district was located in the Niagara peninsula (now in the Regional Municipality of Niagara).  Major centres included the former capital of Upper Canada, Niagara (now Niagara-on-the-Lake), and the town of Ancaster.

The Union Act, 1840 had merged the two provinces of Upper Canada and Lower Canada into the Province of Canada, with a single Parliament.  The separate parliaments of Lower Canada and Upper Canada were abolished.Union Act, 1840, 3 & 4 Vict. (UK), c. 35, s. 2.  The Union Act provided that the pre-existing electoral boundaries of Upper Canada would continue to be used in the new Parliament, unless altered by the Union Act itself.

Lincoln County was one of the electoral districts which was altered by the Union Act.  When originally created in 1792, Lincoln County had been composed of four ridings, each sending a member to the Upper Canada Legislative Assembly.  The Union Act instead split Lincoln County into two different electoral districts, each containing two of the former ridings.

The Union Act defined Lincoln North as follows:

The boundaries of the first and second ridings of Lincoln County had been set out in a  proclamation of the first Lieutenant Governor of Upper Canada, John Graves Simcoe, in 1792:

The boundaries had been further defined by a statute of Upper Canada in 1798:

Those boundaries were used until Lincoln North was abolished on Confederation in 1867.

Members of the Legislative Assembly 

Lincoln North was represented by one member in the Legislative Assembly. The following were the members for Lincoln North.

Abolition 

The electoral district was abolished on July 1, 1867, when the British North America Act, 1867 came into force, creating Canada and splitting the Province of Canada into Quebec and Ontario.

References 

Electoral districts of Canada West